Music for the Jilted Generation is the second studio album by English electronic music group the Prodigy. It was first released in July 1994 by XL Recordings in the United Kingdom and by Mute Records in the United States. Just as on the group's debut album Experience (1992), Maxim Reality was the only member of the band's lineup—besides Liam Howlett—to contribute to the album.

A remastered and expanded edition of the album titled More Music for the Jilted Generation was released in 2008.

Music and content 

Music for the Jilted Generation uses elements of rave, breakbeat techno, techno, and hardcore techno.

The album is largely a response to the corruption of the rave scene in Britain by its mainstream status as well as Great Britain's Criminal Justice and Public Order Act 1994, which criminalised raves and parts of rave culture. This is exemplified in the song "Their Law" with the spoken word intro and the predominant lyric, the "Fuck 'em and their law" sample. Many years later, after the controversy died down, Liam Howlett derided the title of the album, which he referred to as "stupid", and maintained that the album was never meant to be political in the first place.

Many of the samples featured on the album are sound clips from, or inspired by, movies. "Full Throttle" contains a reverse sample from the original Star Wars movie, "Skylined" uses a sample of a sound effect from the 2nd episode of the first season of "The X-Files" and "The Heat (The Energy)" features a sample from Poltergeist III.

When Liam Howlett came to the cutting room for the final phase in the album production, he realised that all the tracks he had originally planned for wouldn't fit onto a CD, so "One Love" had to be edited which resulted in a cut of approximately 3 minutes and 53 seconds, "The Heat (The Energy)" was slightly cut, and the track called "We Eat Rhythm" was left out. "We Eat Rhythm" was later released on a free cassette with Select magazine in October 1994 entitled Select Future Tracks. Liam Howlett later asserted that he felt the edit of "One Love" and "Full Throttle" could have been dropped from the track listing.

Artwork 

The album artwork for Music for the Jilted Generation was designed by Stewart Haygarth (cover) and Les Edwards (inner). The inner art, alluding to the conflicts of raver versus the police during the era of the 1994 Criminal Justice Act, is particularly renowned.

Reception 

Music for the Jilted Generation has received critical acclaim. Rolling Stone gave it three-and-a-half stars, calling it "truly trippy" and saying it "generates universal dance fever". 
Alternative Press said it "throws much darker shapes than its predecessor" and "slams harder and rawer and covers more ground".

Robert Christgau called it "one of the rare records that's damn near everything you want cheap music to be".

Mojo ranked it number 83 in their "100 Modern Classics" list, Spin ranked it number 60 in their "90 Greatest Albums of the '90s"  and NME ranked it number 9 in their "Top 50 Albums of 1994".

On 4 December 2008, radio presenter Zane Lowe inducted it into his 'masterpieces' by playing the album in full on his BBC Radio 1 show.

It was nominated for the Mercury Music Prize in 1994 and is included in the book 1001 Albums You Must Hear Before You Die.

"An amazing record," remarked David Bowie. "It impressed me quite a lot."

Track listing

Samples 
Besides the movie samples described above, Liam Howlett also employed a lot of musical material from other artists:
"Break and Enter" contains a sample from Baby D's "Casanova". The latter was also remixed by Liam.
"Their Law" contains a sample from "Drop That Bassline" by Techno Grooves.
"Voodoo People" contains a sample from "You're Starting Too Fast" by Johnny Pate. The guitar riff is based on "Very Ape" by Nirvana and is played by Lance Riddler.
"The Heat (The Energy)" contains a sample from "Why'd U Fall" by Lil Louis, "Thousand" by Moby and 2-Mad's "Don't Hold Back The Feeling".
"Poison" contains a sample from "It's a New Day" by Skull Snaps, "Amen, Brother" by The Winstons and Bernard "Pretty" Purdie's "Heavy Soul Slinger" .
"No Good (Start The Dance)" contains a sample from "No Good for Me" by Kelly Charles and "Funky Nassau" by Bahamian funk group The Beginning of the End.
"One Love" uses the "Arabic Muezzin" a sample from the ethnic vocals section of a Zero G sample CD by Time + Space Records. The same sample was also used in "Everybody Say Love" by "The Magi & Emanation" which was remixed by Liam Howlett.
"3 Kilos", Part One of The Narcotic Suite, is based on a riff sampled from Bernard "Pretty" Purdie's Good Livin' (Good Lovin') 
"Skylined", Part Two of The Narcotic Suite, features a sound also used in the musical score by Mark Snow for The X-Files episode "Deep Throat" (season 1, episode 2).

Charts

Weekly charts

Year-end charts

Certifications

Personnel 
 Liam Howlett – performing, synthesizers, keyboards, sampling, drum-machines, production (on tracks 1, 2, 3, 6, 8, 11, 12, and 13) at Earthbound studios, co-production (on tracks 4, 5, 7, 9, and 10) at The Strongroom, mixing, engineering
 Maxim Reality – co-writer and vocalist on "Poison"
 Neil McLellan – co-production and mixing (on tracks 4, 5, 7, 9, and 10) at The Strongroom
 Pop Will Eat Itself – performer on "Their Law"
 Phil Bent – live flute
 Lance Riddler – live guitar on "Voodoo People"
 Mike Champion – management
 Les Edwards – inside sleeve painting
 Stuart Haygarth – front cover
 Jamie Fry – rear sleeve

References

External links 
 

The Prodigy albums
1994 albums
Industrial albums by English artists
XL Recordings albums
Albums produced by Liam Howlett